The 1980–81 season was Leeds United's 54th season in the Football League, and their seventeenth consecutive season in the Football League First Division, the top tier of English football, where they finished 9th. Alongside the First Division, the club competed in the FA Cup and the Football League Cup, being eliminated in the third round of the former and the second round of the latter.

Season summary
Leeds began the season in the same poor form that they ended the previous season in, leaving them in the relegation zone for the first few months of the season. Manager Jimmy Adamson resigned after a 4-1 thrashing at the hands of Sunderland, the club he had walked out on to take charge of Leeds two years earlier, and with attendances at their lowest level since the club's last spell in the Second Division, the board tried to win back the supporters by appointing former hero Allan Clarke, who had just steered Barnsley to promotion from the Fourth Division.

Leeds's form picked up greatly after Clarke's appointment, albeit they were knocked out of the FA Cup at the first hurdle by Coventry City, having already been knocked out of the League Cup by eventual Division One champions Aston Villa while Adamson was still manager. The club eventually finished a solid ninth place, and while their having the lowest goalscoring record of any top-flight club that season was cause for concern, it was offset by having one of the best defences in the division; however, their inability to score would foreshadow much bigger, and ultimately terminal, problems they would face next season.

Competitions

Football League First Division

League table

Matches

Source:

FA Cup

Source:

Football League Cup

Source:

Notes

References

1980-81
English football clubs 1980–81 season